Råcksta metro station is a station on the Green line of the Stockholm metro. It is located in the district of Råcksta, which is part of the borough of Hässelby-Vällingby in the west of the city of Stockholm. The station is situated on an embankment and has a single island platform, with access from a lower level station building on Jämtlandsgatan.

The station was inaugurated on 26 October 1952 as a part of the section of line between Hötorget and Vällingby.

As part of Art in the Stockholm metro project, the walls of the ticket hall were decorated with ceramic friezes and hand-glazed tiles by Mia Göransson.

The Vällingby metro depot (Vällingby t-banedepå) is located to the west of the station and accessed from the station by a simple junction.

Gallery

References

Green line (Stockholm metro) stations
Railway stations opened in 1952